In five-dimensional geometry, a 5-cube is a name for a five-dimensional hypercube with 32 vertices, 80 edges,  80 square faces, 40 cubic cells, and 10 tesseract 4-faces.

It is represented by Schläfli symbol {4,3,3,3} or {4,33}, constructed as 3 tesseracts, {4,3,3}, around each cubic ridge. It can be called a penteract, a portmanteau of the Greek word , for 'five' (dimensions), and the word tesseract (the 4-cube). It can also be called a regular deca-5-tope or decateron, being a 5-dimensional polytope constructed from 10 regular facets.

Related polytopes
It is a part of an infinite hypercube family. The dual of a 5-cube is the 5-orthoplex, of the infinite family of orthoplexes.

Applying an alternation operation, deleting alternating vertices of the 5-cube, creates another uniform 5-polytope, called a 5-demicube, which is also part of an infinite family called the demihypercubes.

The 5-cube can be seen as an order-3 tesseractic honeycomb on a 4-sphere. It is related to the Euclidean 4-space (order-4) tesseractic honeycomb and paracompact hyperbolic honeycomb order-5 tesseractic honeycomb.

As a configuration
This configuration matrix represents the 5-cube. The rows and columns correspond to vertices, edges, faces, cells, and 4-faces. The diagonal numbers say how many of each element occur in the whole 5-cube. The nondiagonal numbers say how many of the column's element occur in or at the row's element.

Cartesian coordinates 
The Cartesian coordinates of the vertices of a 5-cube centered at the origin and having edge length 2 are
 (±1,±1,±1,±1,±1),
while this 5-cube's interior consists of all points (x0, x1, x2, x3, x4) with -1 < xi < 1 for all i.

Images

n-cube Coxeter plane projections in the Bk Coxeter groups project into k-cube graphs, with power of two vertices overlapping in the projective graphs.

Projection

The 5-cube can be projected down to 3 dimensions with a rhombic icosahedron envelope. There are 22 exterior vertices, and 10 interior vertices. The 10 interior vertices have the convex hull of a pentagonal antiprism. The 80 edges project into 40 external edges and 40 internal ones. The 40 cubes project into golden rhombohedra which can be used to dissect the rhombic icosahedron. The projection vectors are u = {1, φ, 0, -1, φ}, v = {φ, 0, 1, φ, 0}, w = {0, 1, φ, 0, -1}, where φ is the golden ratio, .

Symmetry
The 5-cube has Coxeter group symmetry B5, abstract structure , order 3840, containing 25 hyperplanes of reflection. The Schläfli symbol for the 5-cube, {4,3,3,3}, matches the Coxeter notation symmetry [4,3,3,3].

Prisms 
All hypercubes have lower symmetry forms constructed as prisms. The 5-cube has 7 prismatic forms from the lowest 5-orthotope, { }5, and upwards as orthogonal edges are constrained to be of equal length. The vertices in a prism are equal to the product of the vertices in the elements. The edges of a prism can be partitioned into the number of edges in an element times the number of vertices in all the other elements.

Related polytopes
The 5-cube is 5th in a series of hypercube:

The regular skew polyhedron {4,5| 4} can be realized within the 5-cube, with its 32 vertices, 80 edges, and 40 square faces, and the other 40 square faces of the 5-cube become square holes.

This polytope is one of 31 uniform 5-polytopes generated from the regular 5-cube or 5-orthoplex.

References 

 H.S.M. Coxeter:
 Coxeter, Regular Polytopes, (3rd edition, 1973), Dover edition, p. 296, Table I (iii): Regular Polytopes, three regular polytopes in n-dimensions (n≥5)
 Kaleidoscopes: Selected Writings of H.S.M. Coxeter, edited by F. Arthur Sherk, Peter McMullen, Anthony C. Thompson, Asia Ivic Weiss, Wiley-Interscience Publication, 1995,  
 (Paper 22) H.S.M. Coxeter, Regular and Semi Regular Polytopes I, [Math. Zeit. 46 (1940) 380-407, MR 2,10]
 (Paper 23) H.S.M. Coxeter, Regular and Semi-Regular Polytopes II, [Math. Zeit. 188 (1985) 559-591]
 (Paper 24) H.S.M. Coxeter, Regular and Semi-Regular Polytopes III, [Math. Zeit. 200 (1988) 3-45]
 Norman Johnson Uniform Polytopes, Manuscript (1991)
 N.W. Johnson: The Theory of Uniform Polytopes and Honeycombs, Ph.D. (1966)

External links 
 

 Multi-dimensional Glossary: hypercube Garrett Jones

5-polytopes
Articles containing video clips